The speckled carpetshark, Hemiscyllium trispeculare, is a bamboo shark in the family Hemiscylliidae found around north and west Australia between latitudes 8° S and 22° S, and longitude 114° E and 152° E.  Its length is up to 79 cm, and it inhabits shallow coral reefs.

Reproduction is oviparous.

See also

 List of sharks
 Carpet shark

References

 
 Compagno, Dando, & Fowler, Sharks of the World, Princeton University Press, New Jersey 2005 

speckled carpetshark
Marine fish of Northern Australia
Taxa named by John Richardson (naturalist)
speckled carpetshark